The 1951 Sydney to Hobart Yacht Race, was the seventh annual running of the "blue water classic" Sydney to Hobart Yacht Race.

Hosted by the Cruising Yacht Club of Australia based in Sydney, New South Wales, the 1951 edition began on Sydney Harbour, at noon on Boxing Day (26 December 1951), before heading south for 630 nautical miles (1,170 km) through the Tasman Sea, past Bass Strait, into Storm Bay and up the River Derwent, to cross the finish line in Hobart, Tasmania.

The 1951 Sydney to Hobart Yacht Race comprised a fleet of 14 competitors. Margaret Rintoul, skippered by AW Edwards won line honours in a new record time of 4 days, 2 hours and 29 minutes, giving both the vessel and skipper back-to-back victories. Struen Marie, skippered by T Williamson was awarded handicap honours on adjusted time.

1951 fleet
14 yachts registered to begin the 1951 Sydney to Hobart Yacht race.

Results

References

See also
Sydney to Hobart Yacht Race

Sydney to Hobart Yacht Race
S
1951 in Australian sport
December 1951 sports events in Australia